Marco Santagata (28 April 1947 – 9 November 2020) was an Italian academic, writer, and literary critic.

Biography
Santagata studied classical literature at the University of Pisa and the Scuola Normale Superiore di Pisa, where he graduated in 1970. He became a professor of literature at Ca' Foscari University of Venice before returning to his alma mater, the University of Pisa, in 1984 as a professor of philology, literature, and linguistics. He was one of the most important Italian specialists of Dante Alighieri and Petrarch.

Marco Santagata died in Pisa on 9 November 2020, at the age of 73,  after contracting COVID-19 amid the ongoing pandemic in Italy. He is buried at the Cimitero di Zocca in the province of Modena.

Works

Novels
Papà non era comunista (1996)
Il copista (2000)
Il maestro dei santi pallidi (2002)
L'amore in sé (2006)
Il salto degli Orlandi (2007)
Voglio una vita come la mia (2008)
Come donna innamorata (2015)
Il movente è sconosciuto (2018)

Essays
Petrarca e i Colonna (1988)
Amate e amanti. Figure della lirica amorosa fra Dante e Petrarca (1999)
La letteratura nei secoli della tradizione. Dalla Chanson de Roland a Foscolo (2007)
Manuale di letteratura italiana contemporanea (2007)
L'io e il mondo. Un'interpretazione di Dante (2011)
Dante. Il romanzo della sua vita (2012), (Dante, The Story of His Life, trans. Richard Dixon, 2016)
Guida all'Inferno (2013)
L'amoroso pensiero. Petrarca e il romanzo di Laura (2014)
Pastorale modenese. Boiardo, i poeti e la lotta politica (2016)
Il racconto della Commedia. Guida al poema di Dante (2017)
Il poeta innamorato. Su Dante, Petrarca e la poesia amorosa medievale (2017)
Boccaccio. Fragilità di un genio (2019)
Le donne di Dante (2021)

Awards
Premio Campiello for Il maestro dei santi pallidi (2003)
Premio Stresa for L'amore in sé (2006)
Premio Comisso for Dante. Il romanzo della sua vita (2013)

References

1947 births
2020 deaths
Writers from Emilia-Romagna
21st-century Italian writers
Academic staff of the Ca' Foscari University of Venice
University of Pisa alumni
Scuola Normale Superiore di Pisa alumni
Italian literary critics
Deaths from the COVID-19 pandemic in Tuscany
Academic staff of the University of Pisa